Florida's 120th House District elects one member of the Florida House of Representatives. The district is represented by Jim Mooney. The district covers Monroe County and part of Miami-Dade, including the Florida Keys archipelago.

Members

Election results

2020

2018

2016

2014
There were no candidates from the Democratic Party that had filed for the 2014 general election.

2012

2010

References 

120
Monroe County, Florida
Miami-Dade County, Florida
Florida Keys